Neelmani ram kripalu is a 1957 Indian Hindi-language film starring Nalini Jaywant.

The film became popular partly because of its evergreen Bhajan song on Lord Krishna, "Suunaa Suunaa Laage . Biraj Kaa Dhaam", sung by Mohammed Rafi.

Music
 "Suna Suna Lage Veraj Ka Dham Gokal Ko Chod" - Mohammed Rafi
 "O Mere Sanware Kanhayi" - Lata Mangeshkar
 "Ho Muraliwale Ho Muraliwale" - Lata Mangeshkar
 "Jab Paap Ki Aandhi" - Sudha Malhotra
 "Jai Kanhaiya Lal Ki Jai Kanhaiya Lal Ki" - Suman Kalyanpur, Mohammed Rafi
 "Nache Gokul Ki Goriya" - Lata Mangeshkar
 "Nand Gaanv Ri Kadamb Chhaanv Ri" - Lata Mangeshkar

1950s Hindi-language films
1957 films
Films scored by Chitragupta